Angier Louis Goodwin (January 30, 1881  – June 20, 1975) was a United States Representative from Massachusetts.

He graduated from Colby College in 1902, and attended Harvard Law School three years later. He was admitted to the Maine bar that same year, the Massachusetts bar in the next, and practiced law in Boston.

He became a member of the Melrose, Massachusetts Board of Aldermen in 1912, and continued until 1914. He rejoined in 1916, and stayed for four more years. He served as president in 1920. He was the mayor of Melrose from 1921 to 1923. He became a member of the Massachusetts State Guard and legal adviser to aid draft registrants during the First World War. He was member of the Planning Board and chairman of the Board of Appeal in Melrose between 1923 and 1925. He served in the Massachusetts House of Representatives from 1925 to 1928.

He was a  member of the Massachusetts Senate from 1929 to 1941, and served as President of the Massachusetts Senate in his last year. He was chairman of the Massachusetts Commission on Participation in New York World's Fair, in 1939 and 1940, and chairman of the Massachusetts Commission on Administration and Finance in 1942. He was elected as a Republican to the Seventy-eighth and to the five succeeding Congresses (January 3, 1943 – January 3, 1955).

He failed reelection in 1954. He was a member of the Massachusetts State Board of Tax Appeals from 1955 to 1960.

See also
 Massachusetts legislature: 1925–1926, 1927–1928, 1929–1930, 1931–1932, 1933–1934, 1935–1936, 1937–1938, 1939, 1941–1942

References 

1881 births
1975 deaths
Colby College alumni
Harvard Law School alumni
Mayors of Melrose, Massachusetts
Republican Party members of the Massachusetts House of Representatives
People from Melrose, Massachusetts
People from Fairfield, Maine
Presidents of the Massachusetts Senate
Republican Party Massachusetts state senators
Republican Party members of the United States House of Representatives from Massachusetts
20th-century American politicians